The 1967 UMass Redmen football team represented the University of Massachusetts Amherst in the 1967 NCAA College Division football season as a member of the Yankee Conference. The team was coached by Vic Fusia and played its home games at Alumni Stadium in Hadley, Massachusetts. UMass finished the season with a record of 7–2 overall and 5–0 in conference play, repeating as conference champions.

Schedule

References

UMass
UMass Minutemen football seasons
Yankee Conference football champion seasons
UMass Redmen football